Jack Keane (7 May 1911 – 7 June 2005) was  a former Australian rules footballer who played with Footscray in the Victorian Football League (VFL).

Notes

External links 
		

1911 births
2005 deaths
Australian rules footballers from Victoria (Australia)
Western Bulldogs players
Koroit Football Club players